In discrete-time control theory, the dead-beat control problem consists of finding what input signal must be applied to a system in order to bring the output to the steady state in the smallest number of time steps.

For an Nth-order linear system it can be shown that this minimum number of steps will be at most N (depending on the initial condition), provided that the system  is null controllable (that it can be brought to state zero by some input).  The solution is to apply feedback such that all poles of the closed-loop transfer function are at the origin of the z-plane.  (For more information about transfer functions and the z-plane see z-transform).  Therefore the linear case is easy to solve.  By extension, a closed loop transfer function which has all poles of the transfer function at the origin is sometimes called a dead beat transfer function.

For nonlinear systems, dead beat control is an open research problem.  (See Nesic reference below).

Dead beat controllers are often used in process control due to their good dynamic properties. They are a classical feedback controller where the control gains are set using a table based on the plant system order and normalized natural frequency.

The deadbeat response has the following characteristics:
 Zero steady-state error
 Minimum rise time
 Minimum settling time
 Less than 2% overshoot/undershoot
 Very high control signal output

Transfer functions 

Consider the transfer function of a plant

with polynomials 

and discrete time delay  . 

The corresponding dead-beat controller is noted as 

 

and the closed-loop transfer function is calculated as

References 
Kailath, Thomas: Linear Systems, Prentice Hall, 1980,  
 Nesic et al.:Output dead beat control for a class of planar polynomial systems
Warwick, Kevin: Adaptive dead beat control of stochastic systems, International Journal of Control, 44(3), 651-663, 1986.

Control theory